Tin Naing Thein (born 1955) is the former Minister of the President's Office of Myanmar, Minister for National Planning and Economic Development and Minister for Livestock and Fisheries. He is a retired brigadier general in the Myanmar Army and previously held the posts of Minister for Commerce and Deputy Minister for Forestry. Tin Naing Thein was elected General Secretary of the Union Solidarity and Development Party, in office from October 2012 to August 2015 successor by Thet Naing Win, former Minister of Border Affairs and retired lieutenant general.

References

1955 births
Living people
Government ministers of Myanmar
Burmese military personnel
Union Solidarity and Development Party politicians
Specially Designated Nationals and Blocked Persons List
Individuals related to Myanmar sanctions